Seo Eun-kwang (born November 22, 1990), also simply known as Eunkwang, is a South Korean singer, songwriter, entertainer and musical actor. He is the leader and main vocalist of the South Korean boy group BtoB.

Biography
Seo was born on November 22, 1990, in Yongin, Gyeonggi in South Korea. He graduated from Dongshin University, majoring in practical music. He has one younger brother named Seo Eun-chong.

Military service
Seo reportedly began military duty by enlisting as an active duty soldier in the military band on August 21, 2018, at the ROK army's 27th division, nicknamed the 'We Will Win' unit in Gangwon-do's Hwacheon County. In October 2018, he received first place out of the recruits in the overall results during basic training. On March 14, he was selected as ROK-SWC for receiving more than 90 points in sit-ups, push-ups, 3 km running, 10 km full combat gear marching and more.

He was discharged from the army on April 7, 2020.

Philanthropy
In 2017, Seo participated in the Donation Applause 337 Relay Campaign with another 200 entertainers and sports stars. The campaign is to share more than three donations and to send warmth to more than three friends and purchase more than 7,000 won. This resulting in Seo's 418 fans donated to the Children's Rehabilitation Hospital, a building facility who was fully funded by Seo to treat children with severe disabilities. On November 21, 2017, Seo and his fans donated ₩10 million to help children with childhood diabetes. Cube Entertainment revealed, "Eunkwang's fans wanted to do something nice for his birthday and started collecting donations for the Korea Diabetes Association, which BtoB works as ambassadors. When Eunkwang heard his fans were preparing to donate, he told the label that he wanted to participate as well and he participated in the donation and delivered the scholarship letter himself."

On April 9, 2019, while serving the military, Seo donated ₩20 million to help the affected areas of the Sokcho Fire through Hope Bridge National Disaster Relief Association.

In January 2020, Korea Heart Foundation reveals that Seo donated ₩20 million to help financially troubled heart patients at the end of 2019. In April 2020, BtoB's fan club 'Melody' donated women's hygiene products to commemorate Seo's discharge. The fan club delivered 3,201 sanitary napkins and wipes through World Human Bridge for pregnant women in vulnerable families who are suffering from COVID-19.

On February 9, 2023, Seo donated 10 million won to help 2023 Turkey–Syria earthquake, by donating money through the Children's Foundation.

Career

BtoB

Seo debuted as the leader and main vocalist of Cube Entertainment's boy group BtoB on March 21, 2012, with the promotional single "Insane". The group is currently active with ten mini albums and two studio album. Eunkwang also contributed as the lyricist in their fourth mini album, Beep Beep with the song "Melody" that is dedicated to their fans.

During his enlistment, BTOB promotions continued in his absence, with Minhyuk as the second leader and Sungjae as the third leader till his discharge.

Solo activities, acting and debut

In 2012, he released a digital single with singer Yoo Sung-eun entitled "Love Virus". A music video was uploaded to BtoB's official YouTube channel, featuring 4Minute's Nam Jihyun and singer Roh Ji-hoon.

In 2013, Seo made his musical debut as "Albert" in the musical, "Monte Cristo". He gained good responses after his performance. He also joined the cast for musical, "Bachelor's Vegetable Store" as Chul Jin-yeok.

In 2014, he became a fixed cast on tvN's variety show SNL Korea 5. He also released the song "Back In The Day" as part of the "Cube Voice Project Part 2".

In 2015, he sang the OST for the drama Mask with singer Miyu. It was entitled "I Miss You." He also joined the studio panel in the MBC variety show, and virtual marriage program, We Got Married.

In 2017–2018, Seo was active in the Korean musical theater scene. He was cast in Hamlet, Goddess is Watching You, Three Musketeers and Barnum: The Great Showman. Due to the sudden news of his enlistment, he was only able to perform 6 of the shows for Barnum: The Great Showman despite practice.

On April 25, 2020, Seo broadcast a 12 hours YouTube Live, 'Silverlight Is Back' on Btob's official channel to celebrate his discharge from the military. On May 7, 2020, it was announced that Seo would release his debut EP in June. He is the sixth member of BtoB to debut as a solo artist. To accompany the release of the EP, Seo will release "Dear My Dear" (Hangul: 서랍; lit. "Drawer"), which served as a pre-release single for Seo's upcoming first solo mini album. Seo's first solo mini album was released on June 8, 2020, with the title "FoRest: Entrance". Its released was followed shortly with the announcement of his first solo concert. Due to the COVID-19 situation in South Korea at the time, the concert was held online.

On August 13, 2020, Seo's appointment as a member of Cube Entertainment's board of directors was revealed through the company's 2020 half term report. Seo thereby became the first artist within Cube Entertainment to reach a director position within the agency.

On October 27, 2020, Cube announced that they have formed a unit called BtoB 4U consisting of Eunkwang, Minhyuk, Changsub and Peniel. The unit debuted on November 16 with their first mini-album, Inside and title track "Show Your Love".

Discography

Extended play

Songs

Filmography

Radio show

Award and nominations

Notes

References

External links
 BTOB Official website 

Living people
Cube Entertainment artists
South Korean male idols
1990 births
K-pop singers
BtoB (band) members
Weekly Idol members
21st-century South Korean male singers
Korean Christians